WYTM-FM (105.5 WYTM Country) is a radio station broadcasting a country music format. Licensed to Fayetteville, Tennessee, United States, the station is owned by Elk River Media, LLC.  WYTM has been on the air since 1970 and is Lincoln County's only full power FM service.  Local hosts include "Bryan and Tracie Morning Show”, from 6-10am and “Saturday Mornings with Ron.”

Format
105.5 WYTM Country has a classic country format, focusing on music from the 1980s and 1990s.  Additional programming includes Roy Warren Quartet Time on Sunday mornings.  Quartet Time, a program of gospel music, obituaries, prayer requests and dedications, began on sister station WEKR in 1948, hosted by Fayetteville Buick dealer Roy Warren.  Since Mr. Warren's death, the show has been hosted by Jack Atchley.  These are the only two hosts in the shows history. 

The “Bryan and Tracie Morning Show” began on WYTM on February 14, 2022 after Ron Wood retired from the morning show. 

WYTM is the home of Lincoln County Falcons football and basketball, as well as University of Tennessee Volunteers football and basketball.

References

External links
 

Country radio stations in the United States
YTM-FM
Lincoln County, Tennessee